In hyperbolic geometry, a uniform honeycomb in hyperbolic space is a uniform tessellation of uniform polyhedral cells. In 3-dimensional hyperbolic space there are nine Coxeter group families of compact convex uniform honeycombs, generated as Wythoff constructions, and represented by permutations of rings of the Coxeter diagrams for each family.

Hyperbolic uniform honeycomb families 

Honeycombs are divided between compact and paracompact forms defined by Coxeter groups, the first category only including finite cells and vertex figures (finite subgroups), and the second includes affine subgroups.

Compact uniform honeycomb families 
The nine compact Coxeter groups are listed here with their Coxeter diagrams, 
in order of the relative volumes of their fundamental simplex domains.

These 9 families generate a total of 76 unique uniform honeycombs. The full list of hyperbolic uniform honeycombs has not been proven and an unknown number of non-Wythoffian forms exist. Two known examples are cited with the {3,5,3} family below. Only two families are related as a mirror-removal halving: [5,31,1] ↔ [5,3,4,1+].

There are just two radical subgroups with non-simplicial domains that can be generated by removing a set of two or more mirrors separated by all other mirrors by even-order branches. The other is [4,(3,5)*], index 120 with a dodecahedral fundamental domain.

Paracompact hyperbolic uniform honeycombs 

There are also 23 paracompact Coxeter groups of rank 4 that produce paracompact uniform honeycombs with infinite or unbounded facets or vertex figure, including ideal vertices at infinity.

Other paracompact Coxeter groups exists as Vinberg polytope fundamental domains, including these triangular bipyramid fundamental domains (double tetrahedra) as rank 5 graphs including parallel mirrors. Uniform honeycombs exist as all permutations of rings in these graphs, with the constraint that at least one node must be ringed across infinite order branches.

[3,5,3] family 

There are 9 forms, generated by ring permutations of the Coxeter group: [3,5,3] or 

One related non-wythoffian form is constructed from the {3,5,3} vertex figure with 4 (tetrahedrally arranged) vertices removed, creating pentagonal antiprisms and dodecahedra filling in the gaps, called a tetrahedrally diminished dodecahedron. Another is constructed with 2 antipodal vertices removed.

The bitruncated and runcinated forms (5 and 6) contain the faces of two regular skew polyhedrons: {4,10|3} and {10,4|3}.

[5,3,4] family 

This family is related to the group [5,31,1] by a half symmetry [5,3,4,1+], or  ↔ , when the last mirror after the order-4 branch is inactive, or as an alternation if the third mirror is inactive  ↔ .

[5,3,5] family 
There are 9 forms, generated by ring permutations of the Coxeter group: [5,3,5] or 

The bitruncated and runcinated forms (29 and 30) contain the faces of two regular skew polyhedrons: {4,6|5} and {6,4|5}.

[5,31,1] family 

If the branch ring states match, an extended symmetry can double into the [5,3,4] family,  ↔ .

[(4,3,3,3)] family 
There are 9 forms, generated by ring permutations of the Coxeter group: 

The bitruncated and runcinated forms (41 and 42) contain the faces of two regular skew polyhedrons: {8,6|3} and {6,8|3}.

[(5,3,3,3)] family 
There are 9 forms, generated by ring permutations of the Coxeter group: 

The bitruncated and runcinated forms (50 and 51) contain the faces of two regular skew polyhedrons: {10,6|3} and {6,10|3}.

[(4,3,4,3)] family 
There are 6 forms, generated by ring permutations of the Coxeter group: .

This symmetry family is also related to a radical subgroup, index 6,  ↔ , constructed by [(4,3,4,3*)], and represents a trigonal trapezohedron fundamental domain.

The truncated forms (57 and 58) contain the faces of two regular skew polyhedrons: {6,6|4} and {8,8|3}.

[(4,3,5,3)] family 
There are 9 forms, generated by ring permutations of the Coxeter group: 

The truncated forms (65 and 66) contain the faces of two regular skew polyhedrons: {10,6|3} and {6,10|3}.

[(5,3,5,3)] family 
There are 6 forms, generated by ring permutations of the Coxeter group: .

The truncated forms (72 and 73) contain the faces of two regular skew polyhedrons: {6,6|5} and {10,10|3}.

Other non-Wythoffians 
There are several other known non-Wythoffian uniform compact hyperbolic honeycombs, and it is not known how many are left to be discovered. Two have been listed above as diminishings of the icosahedral honeycomb {3,5,3}.

In 1997 Wendy Krieger discovered an infinite series of uniform hyperbolic honeycombs with pseudoicosahedral vertex figures, made from 8 cubes and 12 p-gonal prisms at a vertex for any integer p. In the case p = 4, all cells are cubes and the result is the order-5 cubic honeycomb.

Another two known ones are related to noncompact families. The tessellation  consists of truncated cubes  and infinite order-8 triangular tilings . However the latter intersect the sphere at infinity orthogonally, having exactly the same curvature as the hyperbolic space, and can be replaced by mirror images of the remainder of the tessellation, resulting in a compact uniform honeycomb consisting only of the truncated cubes. (So they are analogous to the hemi-faces of spherical hemipolyhedra.) Something similar can be done with the tessellation  consisting of small rhombicuboctahedra , infinite order-8 triangular tilings , and infinite order-8 square tilings . The order-8 square tilings already intersect the sphere at infinity orthogonally, and if the order-8 triangular tilings are augmented with a set of triangular prisms, the surface passing through their centre points also intersects the sphere at infinity orthogonally. After replacing with mirror images, the result is a compact honeycomb containing the small rhombicuboctahedra and the triangular prisms.

Another non-Wythoffian was discovered in 2021. It has as vertex figure a snub cube with 8 vertices removed and contains two octahedra and eight snub cubes at each vertex. Subsequently Krieger found a non-Wythoffian with a snub cube as the vertex figure, containing 32 tetrahedra and 6 octahedra at each vertex, and that the truncated and rectified versions of this honeycomb are still uniform. In 2022, Richard Klitzing generalised this construction to use any snub  as vertex figure: the result is compact for p=4 or 5, paracompact for p=6, and hypercompact for p>6.

Summary enumeration of compact uniform honeycombs 

This is the complete enumeration of the 76 Wythoffian uniform honeycombs. The alternations are listed for completeness, but most are non-uniform.

See also 

 Uniform tilings in hyperbolic plane
 List of regular polytopes#Tessellations of hyperbolic 3-space

Notes

References 
 James E. Humphreys, Reflection Groups and Coxeter Groups, Cambridge studies in advanced mathematics, 29 (1990) 
 The Beauty of Geometry: Twelve Essays (1999), Dover Publications,  (Chapter 10, Regular Honeycombs in Hyperbolic Space)
Coxeter, Regular Polytopes, 3rd. ed., Dover Publications, 1973. . (Tables I and II: Regular polytopes and honeycombs, pp. 294–296)
 Jeffrey R. Weeks The Shape of Space, 2nd edition  (Chapters 16–17: Geometries on Three-manifolds I,II) 
 Coxeter Decompositions of Hyperbolic Tetrahedra, arXiv/PDF, A. Felikson, December 2002
 C. W. L. Garner, Regular Skew Polyhedra in Hyperbolic Three-Space Can. J. Math. 19, 1179–1186, 1967. PDF 
Norman Johnson, Geometries and Transformations (2018), Chapters 11,12,13
N. W. Johnson, R. Kellerhals, J. G. Ratcliffe, S. T. Tschantz, The size of a hyperbolic Coxeter simplex, Transformation Groups 1999, Volume 4, Issue 4, pp 329–353 
 N.W. Johnson, R. Kellerhals, J.G. Ratcliffe,S.T. Tschantz, Commensurability classes of hyperbolic Coxeter groups H3: p130. 
 

Honeycombs (geometry)